William Horace Kindle (January 29, 1891 - November 1, 1952) was a Negro leagues infielder for several years before the founding of the first Negro National League, and in its first few seasons.

He appears to have played most of his career seasons for the Brooklyn Royal Giants and also played at least two seasons with the Lincoln Giants, and one season each for Chicago American Giants, and the Indianapolis ABCs.

Kindle attended Fisk University.

He died in November 1952 in Baltimore, Maryland at the age of 61.

References

External links
 and Baseball-Reference Black Baseball stats and Seamheads

Negro league baseball managers
Chicago American Giants players
Lincoln Giants players
Brooklyn Royal Giants players
Indianapolis ABCs players
Baseball players from Tennessee
People from Mount Pleasant, Tennessee
1891 births
1952 deaths
20th-century African-American sportspeople